The Better Regulation Executive is a part of the British Department for Business, Energy and Industrial Strategy.

It is in charge of regulatory reform across the British Government. A forerunner of the Executive was the Better Regulation Commission.

Policy 
Some regulations are ineffective and unnecessary. Complying with them costs businesses time and money, and can restrict economic growth. Red tape can also make running charities and community groups more challenging than it needs to be. Governments generally attempt to ensure regulations are fair and effective. The Better Regulation Executive's purpose is to effectively strike the right balance between protecting people's rights, health and safety and freeing them from unnecessary bureaucracy.

Actions taken:
controlling the number of new regulations by operating a ‘one in, three out’ rule for business regulation
assessing the impact of each regulation
reviewing the effectiveness of government regulations
reducing regulation for small businesses
improving enforcement of government regulations
using alternatives to regulation
reducing the cost of EU regulation on UK business

References

External links 
Better Regulation Executive official website

Department for Business, Innovation and Skills